Mayko Nguyen is a Canadian actress of Vietnamese descent. She was born on April 19, 1980 in Vancouver, Canada. She has appeared in ReGenesis, Rookie Blue, Killjoys, and Hudson and Rex.

Career
Nguyen has had lead and recurring roles on a variety of television series, including Bloodletting and Miraculous Cures, Cracked and Slasher. Nguyen's most notable television roles are Mayko Tran on ReGenesis, Sue Tran on Rookie Blue and Delle Seyah Kendry on Killjoys.

Nguyen's film work includes Going the Distance, The Last New Year and Below Her Mouth.

Nguyen is also a stage actress, and performed in The Unending during the 2016 Toronto Fringe Festival, and Salt-Water Moon in the spring of 2016.
Starting 2019, she also stars in the Citytv show Hudson & Rex, a serial police drama where a police detective has a German Shepherd as a partner. Her character is the coroner and occasionally goes out on cases.

Filmography

Awards and nominations

References

External links

Living people
Canadian film actresses
Canadian television actresses
University of British Columbia alumni
Canadian actresses of Vietnamese descent
Year of birth missing (living people)